Shooting Star is a Canadian short drama film, directed by Ariane Louis-Seize and released in 2020. The film stars Marguerite Bouchard as Chloé, a teenage girl travelling with her mother Nathalie (Whitney Lafleur) and her mother's boyfriend Christopher (Patrick Hivon) to observe shooting stars, only to begin developing a sexual and romantic attraction of her own to Christopher.

The film premiered at the 2020 Toronto International Film Festival. It was subsequently screened at the Abitibi-Témiscamingue International Film Festival, where it won the Prix Télébec, and at the Whistler Film Festival, where it won the award for Best Canadian ShortWork.

The film received a Prix Iris nomination for Best Live Action Short Film at the 23rd Quebec Cinema Awards in 2021.

References

External links

2020 films
2020 short films
Canadian drama short films
Films shot in Quebec
Films directed by Ariane Louis-Seize
2020 drama films
2020s French-language films
French-language Canadian films
2020s Canadian films